Pictor is a constellation in the Southern Celestial Hemisphere, located between the star Canopus and the Large Magellanic Cloud. Its name is Latin for painter, and is an abbreviation of the older name Equuleus Pictoris (the "painter's easel"). Normally represented as an easel, Pictor was named by Abbé Nicolas-Louis de Lacaille in the 18th century. The constellation's brightest star is Alpha Pictoris, a white main-sequence star around 97 light-years away from Earth. Pictor also hosts RR Pictoris, a cataclysmic variable star system that flared up as a nova, reaching apparent (visual) magnitude 1.2 in 1925 before fading into obscurity.

Pictor has attracted attention because of its second-brightest star Beta Pictoris, 63.4 light-years distant from Earth, which is surrounded by an unusual dust disk rich in carbon, as well as an exoplanet (extrasolar planet). Another five stars in the constellation have been observed to have planets. Among them is HD 40307, an orange dwarf that has six planets orbiting it, one of which—HD 40307 g—is a potential super-Earth in the circumstellar habitable zone. Kapteyn's Star, the nearest star in Pictor to Earth, is a red dwarf located 12.76 light-years away that was found to have two super-Earths in orbit in 2014. Pictor A is a radio galaxy that is shooting an 800,000 light-year long jet of plasma from a supermassive black hole at its centre. In 2006, a gamma-ray burst—GRB 060729—was observed in Pictor, its extremely long X-ray afterglow detectable for nearly two years.

History

The French astronomer Abbé Nicolas-Louis de Lacaille  first described Pictor as  le Chevalet et la Palette (the easel and palette) in 1756, after observing and cataloguing 10,000 southern stars during a two-year stay at the Cape of Good Hope. He devised 14 new constellations in uncharted regions of the Southern Celestial Hemisphere not visible from Europe. All but one honored instruments that symbolised the Age of Enlightenment. He gave these constellations Bayer designations, including ten stars in Pictor now named Alpha to Nu Pictoris. He labelled the constellation Equuleus Pictorius on his 1763 chart, the word "Equuleus" meaning small horse, or easel—perhaps from an old custom among artists of carrying a canvas on a donkey. The German astronomer Johann Bode called it Pluteum Pictoris. The name was shortened to its current form in 1845 by the English astronomer Francis Baily on the suggestion of his countryman Sir John Herschel.

Characteristics
Pictor is a small constellation bordered by Columba to the north, Puppis and Carina to the east, Caelum to the northwest, Dorado to the southwest and Volans to the south. The three-letter abbreviation for the constellation, as adopted by the International Astronomical Union in 1922, is "Pic". The official constellation boundaries, as set by Belgian astronomer Eugène Delporte in 1930, are defined by a polygon of 18 segments (illustrated in infobox). Pictor culminates each year at 9 p.m. on 17 March. Its position in the far Southern Celestial Hemisphere means that the whole constellation is visible to observers south of latitude 26°N, and parts become circumpolar south of latitude 35°S.

Features

Stars

Pictor is a faint constellation; its three brightest stars can be seen near the prominent Canopus. Within the constellation's borders, there are 49 stars brighter than or equal to apparent magnitude 6.5. Located about 97 light-years away from Earth, Alpha Pictoris is the brightest star in the constellation; it is a white main-sequence star with an apparent magnitude of 3.3, and spectral type A8VnkA6. A rapidly spinning star with a projected rotational velocity estimated at 206 km/s, it has a shell of circumstellar gas. Beta Pictoris is another white main sequence star of spectral type A6V and apparent magnitude 3.86. Located around 63.4 light-years distant from Earth, it is a member of the Beta Pictoris moving group—a group of 17 star systems around 12 million years old moving through space together. In 1984 Beta Pictoris was the first star discovered to have a debris disk.  Since then, an exoplanet about eight times the mass of Jupiter has been discovered orbiting approximately 8 astronomical units (AU) away from the star—a similar distance as that between the Sun and Saturn. The European Southern Observatory (ESO) confirmed its presence through the use of direct imagery with the Very Large Telescope in late 2009.

Gamma Pictoris is an orange giant of spectral type K1III that has swollen to 1.4 times the diameter of the Sun. Shining with an apparent magnitude of 4.5, it lies 174 light-years distant from Earth. HD 42540, called 47 Pictoris by  American astronomer Benjamin Apthorp Gould, is a slightly cooler orange giant, with a spectral type of K2.5III and average magnitude 5.04. It has also been suspected of being a variable star. Lacaille mistakenly named this star Mu Doradus, but had recorded its Right Ascension one hour too low. Lacaille named two neighbouring stars Eta Pictoris. Eta2 Pictoris, also known as HR 1663, is an orange giant of spectral type K5III and apparent magnitude 5.05. 474 light-years distant, it has a diameter 5.6 times that of the Sun. Eta1 Pictoris, also known as HR 1649, is 85 light-years distant and is a main sequence star of spectral type F5V and visual magnitude 5.38. A double star, it has a companion of magnitude 13; the two are separated by 11 arcseconds.

Located about 1298 light-years from Earth, Delta Pictoris is an eclipsing binary of the Beta Lyrae type. Composed of two blue stars of spectral types B3III and O9V, the system has a period of 1.67 days, and is observed to dip from apparent magnitude 4.65 to 4.9. The stars are oval-shaped as they are gravitationally distorted by each other. TV Pictoris is a spectroscopic binary system composed of an A-type star and an F-type star which rotate around each other in a very close orbit. The latter star is elliptical in shape and itself varies in brightness. The visual magnitude ranges between 7.37 and 7.53 every 20 hours.

Aside from Beta, five other stars in Pictor are known to host planetary systems. AB Pictoris is a BY Draconis variable star with a substellar companion that is either a large planet or a brown dwarf, which was discovered by direct imaging in 2005. HD 40307 is an orange main sequence star of spectral type K2.5V and apparent magnitude 7.17 located about 42 light-years away. Doppler spectroscopy with the High Accuracy Radial Velocity Planet Searcher (HARPS) indicates that HD 40307 is host to six super-Earth planets, one of which, HD 40307 g, lies in the circumstellar habitable zone of the star, and is not close enough to be tidally locked (i.e. with the same face always facing the star), unlike the other planets in the same system, and many other planets which orbit close to their parent stars. HD 41004 is a complex binary system about 139 light-years distant. The primary is an orange dwarf of spectral type K1V orbited by a planet roughly 2.65 times the mass of Jupiter every 963 days, while the secondary is a red dwarf of spectral type M2V and orbited by a brown dwarf that is at least 19 times as massive as Jupiter. Both substellar components were discovered by doppler spectroscopy using the CORALIE spectrograph in 2004 and 2002 respectively. Kapteyn's Star, a nearby red dwarf at the distance of 12.78 light-years, has a magnitude of 8.8. It has the largest proper motion of any star in the sky after Barnard's Star. Moving around the Milky Way in the opposite direction to most other stars, it may have originated in a dwarf galaxy that was merged into the Milky Way, with the main remnant being the Omega Centauri globular cluster. In 2014 analysis of the doppler variations of Kapteyn's Star with the HARPS spectrograph showed that it hosts two super-Earths—Kapteyn b and Kapteyn c. Kapteyn b is the oldest-known potentially habitable planet, estimated to be possibly 11 billion years old.

Located 1.5 degrees west southwest of Alpha, RR Pictoris is a cataclysmic variable that flared up as a nova, reaching magnitude 1.2 on 9 June 1925. Six months after its peak brightness, it had faded to be invisible to the unaided eye, and was magnitude 12.5 by 1975. RR Pictoris is a close binary system composed of a white dwarf and secondary star that orbit each other every 3.48 hours—so close that the secondary is filling up its Roche lobe with stellar material, which is then transferred onto the first star's accretion disk. Once this material reaches a critical mass, it ignites and the system brightens tremendously. Calculations from the orbital speed suggest the secondary star is not dense enough for its size to still be on the main sequence, so it also must have begun expanding and cooling already after its core ran out of hydrogen fuel.  The RR Pictoris system is estimated to lie around 1300 light-years distant from Earth.

Deep-sky objects

NGC 1705 is an irregular dwarf galaxy 17 million light-years from Earth. It is one of the most active star forming galaxies in the nearby universe, despite the fact that its rate of star formation peaked around 30 million years ago. Pictor A, around 485 million light-years away, is a double-lobed radio galaxy and a powerful source of radio waves in the Southern Celestial Hemisphere. From a supermassive black hole at its centre, a relativistic jet shoots out to an X-ray hot spot 800,000 light years away. SPT-CL J0546-5345 is a massive galaxy cluster located around 7 billion light-years away with a mass equivalent to approximately 800 trillion suns.

GRB 060729 was a gamma-ray burst that was first observed on 29 July 2006. It is likely the signal of a type Ic supernova—the core collapse of a massive star. It was also notable for its extraordinarily long X-ray afterglow, detectable 642 days (nearly two years) after the original event. The event was remote, with a redshift of 0.54.

See also
 Pictor (Chinese astronomy)

Notes

References
Citations

Sources

 
 
 
 
 
 
 
 
 
 
 
 
 
 
 
 
 
 

 
 
 
 
 
 
 
 
 
 
 
 

Online sources

External links
 The clickable Pictor
 

 
Southern constellations
Constellations listed by Lacaille